Semantic mapping can refer to:
 Semantic matching, in computer science, a matching to exchange information in a semantically sound manner, because of the semantic heterogeneity 
 Semantic mapping (statistics), a dimensionality reduction method in statistics
 Semantic mapping (literacy), a technique in which graphical models are used to help school students learn vocabulary
 Semantic mapping, the transformation of data elements from one namespace into another namespace on the Semantic Web, performed by a semantic mapper